Aspidaeglina is an extinct genus from a well-known class of fossil marine arthropods, the trilobites. It lived during the early part of the Arenig stage of the Ordovician Period, a faunal stage which lasted from approximately 473 to 470 million years ago.

Distribution 
 A. miranda is known from the Lower Ordovician of the Czech Republic (Arenig, Klabava Formation).
 A. striata occurs in the Lower Ordovician of China (Pagoda Formation of southwestern Shaanxi).

References

Cyclopygidae
Asaphida genera
Fossils of the Czech Republic
Fossils of China
Ordovician trilobites of Asia
Early Ordovician trilobites of Europe